Idrees Bashir (born December 7, 1978) is a former American football safety in the National Football League. He played college football for the University of Memphis. He was drafted in the second round of the 2001 NFL Draft by the Indianapolis Colts.

In his career Bashir was also a member of the Carolina Panthers and Detroit Lions.

NFL career
Bashir, a defensive back out of Memphis, was drafted in the second round of the 2001 NFL Draft by the Indianapolis Colts. Bashir played in 51 games over 4 seasons (2001–2004) with the Colts, amassing 234 tackles and 5 INT's. After signing with the Panthers prior to the 2005 season, Bashir appeared in 11 games, and had only 2 tackles. He finished the season on the injured reserve with a hamstring injury.

On January 2, 2007, Bashir was signed by the Detroit Lions.

References

1978 births
Living people
Players of American football from Atlanta
American football safeties
Dunwoody High School alumni
Memphis Tigers football players
Indianapolis Colts players
Carolina Panthers players
Detroit Lions players